Jacques d'Arlincourt (25 May 1850 – 27 July 1929) was a French equestrian. He competed in the equestrian mail coach event at the 1900 Summer Olympics.

References

External links

1850 births
1929 deaths
French male equestrians
Olympic equestrians of France
Equestrians at the 1900 Summer Olympics
Place of birth missing
Place of death missing